Coletown is an unincorporated community in Darke County, in the U.S. state of Ohio.

History
A former variant name of Coletown was Coleville. Coleville was laid out in 1848. The railroad station at Coletown was called Mount Heron. A post office called Mount Heron was established in 1847, and remained in operation until 1914.

References

Unincorporated communities in Darke County, Ohio
Unincorporated communities in Ohio